Reykhan (also Romanized as Reykhān; also known as Raikhund, Rakhūnd, Reykhand, and Reykhown) is a village in Kahshang Rural District, in the Central District of Birjand County, South Khorasan Province, Iran. At the 2006 census, its population was 40, in 15 families.

References 

Populated places in Birjand County